Mare Nostrum (English: Our Sea) is a 1948 Italian-Spanish drama film directed by Rafael Gil and starring María Félix, Fernando Rey and Guillermo Marín. The title refers to a Latin phrase for the Mediterranean Sea. A Spanish sailor becomes mixed up with a mysterious foreign spy at the time of the Second World War.

It is an adaptation of the novel of the same name by Vicente Blasco Ibáñez which had previously been turned into a 1926 American silent film.

Plot
German spies, using Freya (María Félix) as bait, convince neutral Spaniard Ulysses Ferragut to navigate a ship to put naval mines around British ports in the Mediterranean, telling him they would never fire on passenger ships. But one mine destroys the ship his son, Esteban, was on, killing him and many others. Searching for revenge, Ulises changes his mind and becomes a friend of the allies.

When U.S. troops take over Naples, Ulises chases the boss of the German spies, who is executed later. Freya begs for her life, but Ulises cannot forgive her, and she is executed too. Finally Ulises dies when his ship is bombed by the Luftwaffe.

Cast
 María Félix as Freya
 Fernando Rey as Ulises / Capitán Ferragut  
 Guillermo Marín as Von Kramer / Conde Gavelin  
 José Nieto as Kurt
 Juan Espantaleón as Tío Caragón  
 Porfiria Sanchíz as Doctora Fedelman  
 Eduardo Fajardo as Capitán  
 Ángel de Andrés as Toni  
 Rafael Romero Marchent as Esteban  
 Nerio Bernardi as Enrico De Paoli  
 Osvaldo Genazzani as John  
 Arturo Marín as Jefe tribunal militar  
 Félix Fernandez as Recepcionista hotel  
 José Franco as Maitre  
 José Prada as Miembro tribunal  
 Manuel Aguilera as Telegrafista  
 Santiago Rivero as Capitán  
 Antonio Vilar 
 Teresa Arcos
 Francisco Bernal

References

Bibliography
 Bentley, Bernard. A Companion to Spanish Cinema. Boydell & Brewer 2008.

External links 

1948 films
1940s spy drama films
Spanish spy drama films
Italian spy drama films
1940s Spanish-language films
Films directed by Rafael Gil
Films based on Spanish novels
Films based on works by Vicente Blasco Ibáñez
Films set in the Mediterranean Sea
Seafaring films
World War I spy films
Suevia Films films
Films scored by Juan Quintero Muñoz
Films produced by Cesáreo González
Italian black-and-white films
Spanish black-and-white films
1948 drama films
1940s Spanish films
1940s Italian films